The following is the qualification system and qualified nations for the weightlifting at the 2019 Pan American Games which will be held in Lima, Peru.

Qualification system
A total of 126 weightlifters (63 per gender) will qualify to compete at the games. A nation may enter a maximum of 12 weightlifters (six per gender). The host nation (Peru) automatically qualified the maximum team size. All other nations qualified through their team scores from both the 2017 and 2018 Pan American Championships combined. A further two wild cards were awarded (one per gender).

Qualification timeline

Qualification summary

Men
The following is the list of nations winning quotas for men's events. The country receiving the wild card will be announced later.
 Host nation: 6 Athletes
 Teams 1st–3rd: 6 Athletes
 Teams 4th–7th: 4 Athletes
 Teams 8th–11th: 3 Athletes
 Teams 12th–15th: 2 Athletes
 Teams 16th–17th: 1 Athlete
 Wild card: 1 athlete

Barbados was awarded a wild card spot and later declined it. It was reallocated to Honduras.

Women
The following is the list of nations winning quotas for women's events. The country receiving the wild card will be announced later.
 Host nation: 6 Athletes
 Teams 1st–3rd: 6 Athletes
 Teams 4th–7th: 4 Athletes
 Teams 8th–11th: 3 Athletes
 Teams 12th–15th: 2 Athletes
 Teams 16th–17th: 1 Athlete
 Wild card: 1 athlete

Aruba was awarded a wild card spot.

References

2017 in weightlifting
2018 in weightlifting
Qualification for the 2019 Pan American Games
Weightlifting at the 2019 Pan American Games